Anheuser-Busch, a wholly owned subsidiary of Anheuser-Busch InBev SA/NV, is the largest brewing company in the United States, with a market share of 45 percent in 2016.

The company operates 12 breweries in the United States and nearly 20 in other countries, which increased after Anheuser-Busch InBev SA/NV acquired SABMiller in 2016.
Brands include Budweiser, Busch, Michelob, Bud Light, and Natural Light.

Budweiser

Budweiser is a 5.0% ABV Adjunct pale lager that was introduced in 1876 by Adolphus Busch and has become one of the best selling beers in the United States. It is made with up to 30% rice in addition to hops and barley malt. Budweiser is produced in various breweries located around the United States and the rest of the world. It is a filtered beer available in draught and packaged forms. Lower strength versions are distributed in regions with restrictive alcohol laws.

Bud Light
In 1985, the ads transitioned to "Gimme a Light", which worked better than the "Drink It All" song for the new name.

From 1993 to 1998, Bud Light aired 30-second commercials featuring Rob and Laura from the CBS series The Dick Van Dyke Show. The Bud Light King and Queen along with the Bud Knight characters were later created for commercials.

Bud Light Platinum
A slightly sweeter, higher alcohol version of Bud Light launched in early 2012, with 6% ABV. This product is noted for being packaged in a new translucent blue glass bottle. Bud Light Platinum has , 8 fewer than a regular Budweiser.

Bud Light Apple
Bud Light with apple flavor added. It has . Released in 2015 with 4.2% ABV.

Bud Light Peels
These beers make up the Bud Light citrus portfolio.

Bud Light Lemonade
Bud Light made with real lemonade. It has . Released in May 2020 with 4.2% alcohol content, the same alcohol content as Bud Light.

Bud Light Lime
Bud Light with lime flavor added. It has . Released in May 2008 with 4.2% alcohol content, the same alcohol content as Bud Light.

Bud Light Orange
Bud Light made with real orange peels. It has . Released in April 2018 with 4.2% alcohol content, the same alcohol content as Bud Light.

Bud Light Seltzer
Bud Light released their own alcoholic seltzer water beverage in mid-January, 2020. The four flavors available include black cherry, lemon lime, strawberry, and mango, and are made from cane sugar and fruit flavor. Each can has 100 calories per 12 US fl oz serving and has 5% ABV.

Bud Light Lime-A-Ritas

Since April 2012, AB has released a line of 8% alcohol by volume (6% ABV in Canada) flavored malt beverages titled "Bud Light Lime Ritas," with its flagship flavor being the "Lime-a-Rita," a lime flavored beverage. The drinks are available in a twenty-five ounce can, as well as a twelve-pack of eight ounce cans. Since then, AB has released the strawberry-flavored "Straw-Ber-Rita," the mango flavored "Mang-o-Rita," and the raspberry flavored "Raz-Ber-Rita." For the winter 2013 season, AB released the cranberry-flavored "Cran-Brrr-Rita" as well, and wound up extending it through January and February 2014 due to strong sales. After the release of the "Mang-o-Rita" and "Raz-Ber-Rita," A-B released an eighteen-pack case containing six "Lime-a-Ritas," four "Straw-Ber-Ritas," four "Mang-o-Ritas," and four "Raz-Ber-Ritas."

In August 2014, A-B released a new fall seasonal extension for their "Rita" line, "Apple-Ahh-Rita," an apple-flavored margarita sold until November 2014.

In February 2015, A-B released a new summer seasonal extension for their "Rita" line, "Lemon-Ade-Rita," a lemonade flavored margarita.

In summer 2016, A-B released the newest "rita" flavor of their line named "Water-melon-rita", a watermelon flavored margarita. A-B also released the "Grape-Ahh-Rita," a grape flavored margarita. In fall 2016, A-B released the new "Cherry-Ahh-Rita," a cherry-flavored margarita.

In summer 2017, A-B released the new "Peach-A-Rita". A-B also released the new "Orange-A-Rita," in certain states and the "Grape-Ahh-Rita" was renamed "Grape-A-Rita". Also in summer 2017, A-B introduced "Splash by Lime-A-Rita," a line of lighter Lime-A-Ritas with less alcohol, calories, and carbs available in three flavors; the existing "Straw-Ber-Rita" and the two new flavors "Pine-Apple-Rita" and "Coco-Nut-Rita." In the fall of 2017, A-B introduced Pome-Granate-Rita. 

In 2018, A-B introduced several flavors, including, Pine-Apple-Rita, Coco-Nut-Rita, Grape-Fruit-Rita, Berry-A-Rita, and brought back the watermelon flavor. 

In 2019, Passion-Fruit-Rita and Cherry-Lime-Rita were introduced and cranberry came back. In 2020, A-B introduced Guav-A-Rita.

Budweiser Select
Anheuser-Busch has aggressively promoted Budweiser Select. Its slogan was "The Real Deal". The company hired Jay-Z as a spokesman for the brand.

Budweiser Select 55
A version of Budweiser Select that contains  is "a direct counterstrike to Miller's MGD 64" according to Anheuser-Busch officials. Budweiser currently claims that it is the lightest beer in the world. The food energy in both Miller's MGD 64 and Budweiser's Select 55 have been reduced simply by lowering the fermentables content. MGD 64 has only 2.8% alcohol content and some Select 55 states "alcohol content not more than 3.2% by weight / 4% by volume", possibly to allow its sale in areas where that is the limit. The actual alcohol content of "55" is reported to be 2.4% ABV; by comparison, most American lagers have around 5%.

Budweiser 66
Budweiser Brew No. 66 is a 4% alcohol by volume lager that is brewed and distributed in the United Kingdom by InBev UK Limited. Launched in July 2010, Budweiser 66 has 84 Calories in a 300 ml serving (just over 10 oz).

Budweiser 1933 Repeal Reserve
A 6% ABV amber lager style introduced in November 2017, inspired by a pre-prohibition recipe.

Bud Ice
Introduced in October 1993 as Ice by Budweiser, it has more alcohol (5.5% ABV) than Budweiser. It is best known for an advertising campaign that involved a malevolent penguin that stalked Bud Ice drinkers and stole their beer, announcing its presence by singing the "doo-be-doo-be-doo" phrase from "Strangers in the Night".

Bud Extra
A beer with caffeine, ginseng, guarana and alcohol. It contains 6.6% ABV. It was marketed as a caffeinated malt beverage, similar to Sparks. On June 26, 2008, Anheuser-Busch announced that it would remove caffeine and guarana from the beverage in response to concerns that the product was being marketed to consumers under the age of 21.

Budweiser/Bud Light Chelada
A blend of Budweiser or Bud Light and Clamato. This beverage became available nationally in late 2007.

Budweiser NA
Non-alcoholic version of Budweiser developed for the Middle Eastern market. Also available in Green Apple and Tropical Fruits versions.

Budweiser Zero 
Shortly after Prohibition Brew's discontinuation, InBev announced a new Non-alcohol beer brink called Budweiser Zero. NBA player Dwyane Wade partnered with the company in the creation of the drink, stating "it was personal to me because of my mom's and dad's journey through addiction" and called the drink "a can that gives you that encouragement" while attempting to avoid alcohol. In May of 2022, InBev announced that they were falling short of their previously stated goal of 20% of their beverage volume being alcohol free, having reached 6% saturation at the time.

The drink features zero sugar, zero alcohol, zero carbs, and fifty calories. Various promotions tied to the product have been offered, such as free Uber rides, and an NFT offering. It has been received with mixed reviews. InBev has received negative press from critics with complaints such as "who drinks Budweiser for the taste", and The Week calling it "an attack on American values". It has mixed to positive reviews among taste testers, being praised to its beer-like appearance and taste, and slightly criticized for being bland in flavor.

Discontinued

Budweiser American Ale
Budweiser American Ale debuted in 2008. The beer was claimed to offer complex taste without much bitterness. American Ale had a distinctive hoppier flavor than other Anheuser-Busch beers, in an attempt to capture some of the American craft beer market, although most American craft beers are hoppier. American Ale was the first beer under the Budweiser name that was brewed with a top fermenting yeast. The beer's darker color was a departure from the other Budweiser brands. Production was discontinued by 2015.

Budweiser Brew Masters' Private Reserve
Budweiser Brew Masters' Private Reserve is an all-malt lager with a honey color and robust taste.

Budweiser Malt Liquor
Introduced in limited test markets between 1970 and 1973, it's slogan was "The first malt liquor good enough to bear the name."

Bud Dry

Bud Dry was introduced nationally in the U.S. in April 1990 with the slogan of "Why ask why? Try Bud Dry." It was originally successful in test markets and was expected to be a popular beer with the rise in light lager popularity. Dry beer is a form of pale lager where the sugars are more fully fermented to give a less sweet beer. It is also known as the Diät-Pils style. However, after the introduction of Bud Ice in 1994, Bud Dry was not heavily marketed. Production was discontinued in December 2010.

Bud Ice Light
It undergoes fractional freezing, which Bud Light does not undergo. It was discontinued in 2010.

Bud Light Golden Wheat
On October 5, 2009, Budweiser officially released Bud Light Golden Wheat, a response to the increase in the amount of wheat beers produced from craft brewers around the country. This beer had , 8.3 grams of carbohydrates and 4.1% alcohol by volume. It was an American Hefeweizen which is based on the classic German Hefeweizen style. Production was discontinued in 2012.

Bud Silver
An attempt to appeal to the tastes of beer drinkers in the United Kingdom, this specially brewed beer contained 4.2% alcohol by volume. It was discontinued in 2006 after it failed to meet sales expectations.

Red Wolf
A red ale marketed during the 1990s in the United States. It was enjoyed by some consumers, but neither as well known nor as popular as other Anheuser-Busch brands. Discontinued circa 2000.

Budweiser Prohibition Brew 
In 2015, AB InBev committed to ensuring that low-alcohol and nonalcoholic beers would represent at least 20% of its global beer volume by 2025. They followed the announcement by launching their Prohibition Brew-branded non-alcoholic drink and introduced it to the Canadian market in 2016. It was brewed in the same method as Budweiser, with the alcohol removed via evaporation. It was discontinued in 2020, in favor of a new non-alcoholic beer brand, Budweiser Zero, which features a different recipe and a partnership with professional NBA player Dwyane Wade.

Michelob

Michelob is a 4.7% ABV pale lager developed by Adolphus Busch in 1896 as a "draught beer for connoisseurs". Michelob is the German name for Měcholupy, now in the Czech Republic, where Anton Dreher had a brewery.

In 1961, Anheuser-Busch produced a pasteurized version of Michelob which allowed legal shipment of the beer across state lines. Bottled beer began to be shipped soon after, and the brand was introduced in cans in 1966. Bottled Michelob was originally sold in a uniquely shaped bottle named the teardrop bottle because it resembled a water droplet. The teardrop bottle was awarded a medal from the Institute of Design in 1962. Five years later the bottle was redesigned for efficiency in the production line. This bottle was used until 2002 when it was dropped in favor of a traditional bottle. The teardrop bottle was used again from January 2007 to October 2008.

Brand variation 
The company introduced Michelob Light in 1978. Michelob Classic Dark was made available in 1981 in kegs, with a bottled version following three years later. In 1991, Michelob Golden Draft was introduced to compete against Miller Genuine Draft in the Midwest.

1997 saw the introduction of several specialty beers under the Michelob marquee. These include:

 Michelob Honey Lager
 Michelob Pale Ale
 Michelob Marzen
 Michelob Pumpkin Spice Ale
 Michelob Winter's Bourbon Cask Ale

AmberBock is a 5.1% ABV amber lager which uses roasted black barley malt in the ingredients, and which received a World Beer Cup Bronze Medal in 1998.

From the beginning, the specialty beers have had a very limited distribution. The chief outlet has been through a "holiday sampler pack" produced during the Christmas holiday season. Other specialty beers that are no longer in production include Michelob Hefeweizen and Michelob Black & Tan. Some (notably Michelob AmberBock) have subsequently gone into larger production, while others have not. The brewery continues to experiment with specialty beers—in 2005 an oak-aged vanilla beer was sold under the Michelob logo, available in single pints. In 2006 Michelob added a chocolate beer to the oak-aged vanilla Celebrate holiday season beer released a year earlier. Michelob also brewed Michelob Bavarian Style Wheat and Michelob Porter for its "holiday sampler pack". In 2007, Michelob launched its Seasonal Specialty Line. These include:

 Michelob Bavarian Wheat (summer)
 Michelob Marzen (fall)
 Michelob Porter (winter)
 Michelob Pale Ale (spring)

The early 21st century saw in the U.S. a demand for diet beer similar to that of the early 1970s, and in 2002 the Michelob line responded with the introduction of Michelob Ultra, advertised as being low in carbohydrates. Later Michelob Ultra Amber, a darker, more flavorful beer, was added to this sub-line.

According to a report by Beer Marketer's Insights and published by USA Today on December 9, 2013, sales of Michelob Light declined by nearly 70% between 2007 and 2012. The article listed Michelob Light as one of "nine beers many Americans no longer drink."

All fruit flavors have the following nutrition content: 107 calories, 6.0g carbs, 0.5g protein and 0.0g fat, per 12 oz bottle.

Marketing
Advertisements for Michelob Ultra feature people engaged in sporting activities. The Michelob ULTRA Open at Kingsmill and Michelob Ultra Futures Players Championship, were sponsored by Michelob Ultra. Michelob Ultra serves as a presenting sponsor of the Tour of Missouri bicycle race and sponsors the King of the Mountains jersey. Michelob also sponsors the Rugby Super League, and many of its teams have shirt sponsorships with its AmberBock brand. PGA Tour players Sergio García and Brooks Koepka are both sponsored by Michelob, as well as veteran beach volleyball player Kerry Walsh. Lance Armstrong signed on October 6, 2009 a three-year agreement to become Michelob Ultra's new spokesperson and ambassador, but was dropped by the company in 2012 after being accused of using performance-enhancing drugs.

Michelob sponsored several episodes of the Diggnation podcast. The hosts, Kevin Rose and Alex Albrecht, sampled the beer during the show and several episodes included interviews with the company's head brew-master to discuss the different products that can be found in the sampler packs. Also, an episode of the show was filmed inside the Michelob brewery.

Michelob is famous for its late-1980s TV commercials that used the slogan, "The night belongs to Michelob", which centered on its "night" theme and used songs that had the word "night" or a form of the word "night" in its title, including "The Way You Look Tonight" by Frank Sinatra, "Move Better in the Night" by Roger Daltrey, "Tonight, Tonight, Tonight" by Genesis, "Don't You Know What the Night Can Do?" and "Talking Back to the Night" by Steve Winwood, and a new recording of "After Midnight" by Eric Clapton. In the 1980s and 1990s, Michelob used the slogan "Some days are better than others".

In February 2023, Williams Racing announced a multi-year partnership with Michelob Ultra. This reunites Williams with Anheuser-Busch for the first time since 2006 when Budweiser sponsored the then-BMW WilliamsF1 Team from 2003.

Rolling Rock

Rolling Rock is a 4.5% ABV pale lager launched in 1939 by the Latrobe Brewing Company. In May 2006, Anheuser-Busch purchased the Rolling Rock brand from InBev for $82 million and began brewing Rolling Rock at its Newark facility in mid July 2006. Other pale lagers marketed under the Rolling Rock brand name are Rock Green Light, 3.7% ABV, and Rock Light, 3.5%; the company also produces a 5% ABV amber lager, Rolling Rock Red. Ingredients are pale barley malt, rice, corn and hops.

Busch
Busch Beer, a 4.7% ABV economy brand lager was introduced in 1955 as Busch Bavarian Beer; the brand name was changed in 1979 to Busch Beer.

The Busch brand had been introduced largely in response to Major League Baseball rules in force in the 1950's, when stadium corporate naming rights were a fairly new and somewhat controversial concept. At the time, naming ballparks after alcoholic beverages was expressly forbidden. Unable to rename Sportsman's Park "Budweiser Stadium" as a result, company chairman and then-new Cardinals owner Gussie Busch named the venue for himself two years before introducing Busch beer.

Other beers marketed under the Busch brand name are Busch Light, a 4.1% light lager introduced in 1989, Busch Ice, a 5.9% ice beer introduced in 1995, and Busch NA, a non-alcoholic brew. Ingredients are a mix of American-grown and imported hops and a combination of malt and corn. At a slightly lower price point than flagship brand Budweiser, it serves as Anheuser-Busch's second most popular brand.  It competes directly with the MillerCoors brand Milwaukee's Best, Keystone/Keystone Premium, while Busch Light competes directly with Milwaukee's Best Light, Keystone Light and Southpaw Light and Busch Ice competes directly with the Milwaukee's Best Ice, Keystone Ice/V9 and Icehouse.

In September 2020, Busch released Dog Brew, a non-alcoholic beverage for dogs. The "beer" contains neither alcohol nor hops, but is instead made with pork bone broth, water, vegetables, herbs, and spices.

Shock Top

Shock Top is a 5.2% ABV Belgian-style wheat ale introduced under the name Spring Heat Spiced Wheat brewed in Fort Collins, Colorado as a seasonal beer in 2006, then all year from 2007. The beer is brewed with wheat malt, two-row barley, orange, lemon, lime peel, coriander and Cascade and Willamette hops. Entering as the Spring Heat Spiced Wheat, Shock Top Belgian White won gold and bronze medals in the Belgian Wit (White) category at the 2006 and 2007 North American Beer Awards, earning the reputation as America's Beer respectively.
It competes directly with the MillerCoors brand Blue Moon.

Natural
Natural Light is an economy brand 4.2% ABV reduced-calorie pale lager introduced in 1977. The brand was originally called Anheuser-Busch Natural Light. In 2008 The Wall Street Journal listed it as the fifth largest selling beer in the U.S. Natural Ice is an economy brand 5.9% ABV ice beer, introduced in 1995. Nearly two decades after the introduction of Natural Ice a malt liquor named Natty Daddy (8% and 5.9% ABV) was added to the market in 2012.  It competes directly with the MillerCoors brand Keystone Light, Milwaukee's Best Light, Southpaw Light while Natural Ice competes directly with Keystone Ice/V9, Milwaukee's Best Ice and Icehouse and Natty Daddy competes against Keylightful, Keystone Lime and Icehouse Edge. Anheuser Busch continues to add to the Natural Light profile releasing Naturdays in 2019. Currently there are three flavors, original strawberry lemonade, pineapple lemonade and red, white and blueberry.

Johnny Appleseed
Johnny Appleseed is a 5.5% ABV cider produced by Anheuser-Busch subsidiary Brokenstraw Beverage LLC and introduced in April 2014. Brokenstraw Beverage was created by Anheuser-Busch in 2014 as a corporate identity to manufacture and distribute Johnny Appleseed out of their Baldwinsville, New York brewery.

LandShark Lager

LandShark Lager, brewed in Jacksonville, Florida, is a 4.6% ABV island-style lager launched in 2006 as the house lager for "Jimmy Buffett's Margaritaville" restaurant chain, to compete with Grupo Modelo's Corona. 

Under a sponsorship deal, Dolphin Stadium, home of the Miami Dolphins, Florida Marlins and the Miami Hurricanes, was renamed "Land Shark Stadium" for the 2009 football season. The contract ended in early 2010, and the stadium was renamed "Sun Life Stadium" as of January 18, 2010, in time for both the 2010 NFL Pro Bowl and Super Bowl XLIV. The stadium was renamed Hard Rock Stadium in 2016.

LandShark also has Bar & Grill locations in Pensacola, Florida, Myrtle Beach, South Carolina, Atlantic City, New Jersey, Branson, Missouri, Buford, Georgia, and Biloxi, Mississippi.

The name is derived from the Jimmy Buffett song "Fins", where men in a beach town trying to woo a vacationing woman are referred to as "sharks that can swim on the land."

Previously craft beer ownership

Goose Island Brewery

Goose Island started in 1988 as a brewpub in Chicago, and opened a separate bottling plant there in 1995. The brewery and its beers were purchased by Anheuser-Busch InBev in 2011. The Chicago brewery continues to produce and sell small batch beers while their national offerings are made in bulk at various Anheuser-Busch facilities.

Blue Point

On February 5, 2014, it was announced that Blue Point Brewing Company was being sold to Anheuser-Busch InBev for nearly $24 million. As of the time of sale, the brewery will continue to operate in its Patchogue, New York, location.

10 Barrel
In November 2014, it was reported that 10 Barrel Brewing, with brewpubs in Bend, Oregon, and Boise, Idaho, would be acquired by Anheuser-Busch. This was the second small brewing company acquired by the company in that calendar year.

Elysian Brewing Company

Elysian was founded in Seattle, Washington, in 1995 by Dave Buhler, Joe Bisacca, and Dick Cantwell. On January 23, 2015, it was announced that Elysian would be sold to Anheuser-Busch in a deal expected to close within three months.

Golden Road Brewing
The purchase of Golden Road Brewery in Los Angeles was announced on September 23, 2015.

Four Peaks Brewery

Four Peaks announced on December 18, 2015, that it had been acquired by ABInbev as part of its High End unit.

Breckenridge Brewery

Several days after acquiring the Four Peaks brand and assets, InBev announced the purchase of Breckenridge Brewery, with brewpubs based in Colorado.

Devils Backbone Brewing Company

Devils Backbone announced on April 12, 2016, that it had been acquired by ABInbev as part of its High End unit.

Karbach Brewing Company

Karbach Brewing Company announced on November 3, 2016, that it had been acquired by ABInbev as part of its High End unit.

Wicked Weed Brewing

Wicked Weed Brewing announced on May 3, 2017, that it had been acquired by ABInbev as part of its High End unit.

Malt liquors

King Cobra

King Cobra is a 6% alcohol by volume malt liquor introduced in 1984. It is brewed with a warmer fermentation than used for the company's pale lagers, and the ingredients include barley malt and corn. Shortly after its launch, King Cobra was supported by an advertising campaign featuring actor, martial artist, and former American football player Fred Williamson and the tag-line "Don't let the smooth taste fool you!"

Hurricane

Hurricane High Gravity Lager is an 8.1% alcohol malt liquor beverage available primarily in the United States. It is available in 40 ounce bottles, as well as 12, 16, 24, and 25 ounce cans. Recently, Hurricane High Gravity 8.1% has gone from a Black Label to a Silver Label in all of its serving sizes. Hurricane also comes in a lower alcohol content just called Hurricane malt liquor usually sold in a 40-ounce bottle with an ABV of 5.9%.

Spykes
The company introduced a flavored 12% ABV malt liquor under the name Spykes in 2007. It was sold in colorful, 2-ounce bottles. Available flavors included mango, lime, melon and chocolate. It was withdrawn in the same year after criticism from alcohol industry watchdog groups that it was being marketed to underage customers, and the Alcohol and Tobacco Tax and Trade Bureau found that the labeling of Spykes was illegal.

Others
 Bon & Viv Spiked Seltzer a new take on hard seltzer to be introduced to the public on February 3, 2019 Super Bowl Sunday
 Green Valley Brewing Company, has a craft beer appearance; "Anheuser-Busch" does not appear on labels of its products.
 Redbridge, a gluten-free beer made from sorghum.
 Tequiza was a 4.5% ABV fruit flavored pale lager introduced in 1998 in limited markets in the US, then withdrawn in January 2009. Tequiza Extra, with more Tequila flavor and less lime, was test-marketed in 2000
 Tilt, a line of fruit flavored malt beverages.
 Wild Blue Lager, a strong lager with blueberries.
 Ziegenbock, sold in Texas and nearby states.

Minority ownership brands
As of January 2013, Anheuser-Busch InBev had 32.2% ownership in the Craft Brew Alliance, a beer brewing company that is composed of several beer and cider brands.
 Redhook Ale Brewery founded by Gordon Bowker and Paul Shipman in 1981 in Seattle, Washington;
 Widmer Brothers Brewery founded by brothers Kurt and Rob Widmer in 1984 in Portland, Oregon;
 Kona Brewing Company founded by father and son team Cameron Healy and Spoon Khalsa in 1994 in Kona, Hawaii;
 Omission Beer developed internally in 2012 in Portland, Oregon; and
 Square Mile Cider, launched in 2013

Craft beer distribution alliances
Beers made by smaller "craft" breweries which are co-distributed with A-B brands by select distributors:
 Fordham Brewing Company
 Old Dominion Brewing Company

References

External links
 Anheuser-Busch website

Anheuser-Busch beer brands